The Ensenada 20 is an American trailerable sailboat that was designed by Lyle C. Hess as a cruiser and first built in 1972.

The Ensenada 20 is a raised deck development of the 1967 Balboa 20 by the same designer.

Production
The design was built by Coastal Recreation, Inc in the United States, from 1972 until 1981, but it is now out of production.

Design
The Ensenada 20 is a recreational keelboat, built predominantly of fiberglass, with wooden trim. It has a fractional sloop rig, a raked stem, an angled transom, an optional pop-top cabin, a transom-hung rudder controlled by a tiller and a lifting keel. It displaces  and carries  of ballast.

The boat is normally fitted with a small  outboard motor for docking and maneuvering.

The design has sleeping accommodation for four people, with a double "V"-berth in the bow cabin and two straight settee quarter berths in the main cabin. The galley is located on both sides, just aft of the bow cabin. The galley is equipped with an icebox and a sink. The head is located under the bow "V"-berth.

Operational history
In a 2010 review Steve Henkel wrote, "best features: Optional poptop increases headroom significantly but can be a nuisance underway, as owners report that visibility is affected and the jibsheets can catch. The big foredeck is good for sunbathing. Worst features: ... the heavy swing keel can be a nuisance and even dangerous if it is not locked and pinned ... Most boats produced included kickup rudders, but some were fixed, and those could be damaged going aground. Deck winches as furnished are too small for yeoman duty. Starboard-mounted mainsheet cam cleat is an inconvenience when on starboard tack. Owner must add his own topping lift. There’s no good place to store a portable gas tank."

See also
List of sailing boat types

Related development
Balboa 20
RK 20

References

External links
Photo of an Ensenada 20
Video of sailing an Ensenada 20

Keelboats
1970s sailboat type designs
Sailing yachts
Trailer sailers
Sailboat types built in the United States
Sailboat type designs by Lyle Hess
Sailboat types built by Coastal Recreation, Inc